The International Automotive Task Force (IATF) is an ad hoc group of automotive manufacturers and related industry associations formed to improve the collective quality control across supply chains in the automotive industry.

Specifically, the purposes for which the IATF was established are:
 Develop a consensus regarding international fundamental quality system requirements for production materials, products and services (e.g., heat treating, painting and plating).
 Develop policies and procedures for the common IATF third party registration scheme to ensure consistency worldwide.
 Provide appropriate training to support IATF 16949 requirements and the IATF registration scheme.
 Establish formal liaisons with appropriate bodies to support IATF objectives.

Members 
 ANFIA (Italy)
 BMW Group
 BorgWarner
 Daimler AG
 DAF Trucks N.V.
 FCA Italy Spa
 FCA US LLC
 FIEV (France)
 Ford Motor Company
 General Motors
 MARUTI SUZUKI (INDIA)
 Newman Technology Inc.
 Groupe PSA
 Renault
 SMMT (U.K.)
 VDA (Germany)
 VE COMMERCIAL VEHICLES (INDIA)
 Volkswagen AG and the vehicle manufacturers respective trade associations – AIAG (U.S.)
 ZF (Germany)
 Mahindra (India)
 Geely Automobile (China)
 Seb Leblogauto.com (France)
 Okinawa Autotech(India)

References

External links
Japan Automobile Manufacturers Association, Inc.
Official website of the IATF

Motor trade associations
Quality control